Starla is a 2019 Philippine drama television series starring Joel Torre, Jana Agoncillo, Enzo Pelojero, Judy Ann Santos, Meryll Soriano, Joem Bascon, and Raymart Santiago. The series aired on ABS-CBN's Primetime Bida evening block and worldwide via The Filipino Channel from October 7, 2019 to January 10, 2020, replacing The General's Daughter and was replaced by Make It with You.

Premise
Starla is a story about renewed hope, the warmth of home, love for the family, wishes that come true, and impeccable forgiveness. It revolves around Buboy, a boy who discovers a wayward wishing star named Starla and uses her to save his town.

Cast and characters

Main
 Judy Ann Santos as Atty. Teresa "Tere" Dichavez-Manalo
 Joel Torre as Gregorio "Mang Greggy" Dichavez
 Jana Agoncillo as Starla / Stella
 Enzo Pelojero as Buboy Dichavez
 Meryll Soriano as Ester Rivera
 Joem Bascon as Atty. Dexter Soliman
 Raymart Santiago as Dr. Philip Manalo

Supporting
 Grae Fernandez as George Cultura
 Chanty as Lena Batumbakal
 Bodjie Pascua as Kulas Trinidad
 Simon Ibarra as Kapitan  Domingo "Domeng" Jacinto
 Jerry O'Hara as Apol Magtulis
 Joel Saracho as Ambo Soberano
 Kathleen Hermosa as Frida Matias
 Janus del Prado as Boyong dela Cruz
 Jordan Herrera as Pedro Jaena
 Anna Luna as Lolita Batumbakal
 Dolly de Leon as Carmelita
 Marilen Cruz as Trining Manalo
 Matt Daclan as Javi Diaz
 Poppert Bernadas as Kanor Sanchez
 Jimmy Marquez as Sylvester Gil
 Alex Baena as Tonton Rivera
 Roanne Maligat as Jepoy Kho
 Myel de Leon as Nova
 Raikko Mateo as Astro
 Chunsa Jeung as Celestia

Guests
 Tirso Cruz III as Atty. Robert Salazar
 Charo Santos-Concio as Lola Tala
 Heaven Peralejo as teen Teresa
 Yesha Camile as young Teresa
 Brace Arquiza as teen Philip
 Ana Abad Santos as Lita Villarreal-Dichaves

Broadcast
Starla premiered on ABS-CBN on October 7, 2019.

Reruns
Reruns of Starla was aired over at Jeepney TV.

On June 4, 2020, it was announced that the show will also have a rerun on the Kapamilya Channel beginning June 15, 2020 until November 29, 2020 and was replaced by Pinoy Big Brother: Connect.

Reception

Ratings

Accolades

See also
 List of programs broadcast by ABS-CBN
 List of ABS-CBN drama series

References

External links
 
 

ABS-CBN drama series
Philippine fantasy television series
Fantaserye and telefantasya
Television shows set in the Philippines
2019 Philippine television series debuts
2020 Philippine television series endings
Television series by Dreamscape Entertainment Television
2010s children's television series
2020s children's television series